Tzahala (Hebrew: צהלה‎) is an upmarket residential neighborhood of Tel Aviv, Israel. It is located in the northeastern part of the city. The neighborhood was established in 1951, and is named after the Israel Defense Forces (IDF). It was established to house IDF officers and veterans of the 1948 War.

In 2015, the neighborhood was the second wealthiest in Israel. The neighborhood is organized as a cooperative society for housing. Residents of the neighborhood pay two-year membership fees to the association, and choose the association's committee.

Isaac Herzog grew up and lives in the neighborhood.

The most noticeable villa in the neighborhood is the modernist Orange House, built by the Ginzburg family.

References

Ashkenazi Jewish culture in Tel Aviv
Neighborhoods of Tel Aviv
Upper class